The  Miss Alabama Teen USA competition is the pageant that selects the representative for the state of Alabama in the Miss Teen USA pageant and the name of the title held by that winner.

Alabama's success at Miss Teen USA has improved in recent years, with eight teens making the cut, although none have placed higher than 4th runner-up until 2016. That placement went to Anna Mingus, who also won Miss Congeniality, Alabama's only special award until Erin Snow won Miss Photogenic in 2016. Mingus later took the title Miss Alabama USA in 1995, and is one of only three Alabama teens to win a Miss USA state title.

Until 2010 Miss and Teen Alabama was directed by the Premier Pageants group, and was the first state to be taken under this directorate. Dohn Dye and To Dye For was the Director for the 2010 and 2011 pageants, but were replaced by Paula Miles and RPM Productions in August 2011.

The current titleholder is AnnaLee Story, who was crowned on January 15, 2022 at Jay & Susie Gogue Performing Arts Center in Auburn, Alabama.

Results summary

Placements
3rd runners-up: Erin Snow (2016)
4th runners-up: Anna Mingus (1988), Kalin Burt (2019)
Top 6: Christine King (1992)
Top 10: Jeannie Plott (1989), Terra Moody (2004), Canden Jackson (2007)
Top 15/16: Courtney Parker (2008), Ashlyn Alongi (2010), Peyton Brown (2012), Lorin Holcombe (2013), Taylor Ryan Elliott (2015)
Alabama holds a record of 12 placements at Miss Teen USA.

Awards
Miss Congeniality: Anna Mingus (1988), Kennedy Cromeens (2018)
Miss Photogenic: Sarah-Baskin Champion (2014), Erin Snow (2016)

Winners

References

External links
Official website

Alabama
Women in Alabama